James Terence Small (10 February 1969 – 10 July 2019) was a South African rugby union winger who played for the Springboks. His international debut was against the All Blacks in 1992 and he made his final appearance against Scotland in 1997. In that final test match, he scored his 20th try, becoming the leading Springbok try scorer, eclipsing Danie Gerber's record. He was also the leading try scorer in the 1996 Super 12 season.

Early life and education 
Small was born in Cape Town to a working-class family, and attended Risidale Primary School and Greenside High School in Johannesburg, South Africa. He obtained Transvaal Colours for athletics and competed in the 100m and 400m when he was 16, but looking back said lacked the discipline in school required by athletics, preferring rugby as the fun alternative. He said he was offered the opportunity to go to San Diego State University for athletics but had to turn down the offer as his family could not afford for him to travel there. At school he was involved in soccer, but was banned from the sport after a falling out with a referee, after which he turned to rugby. He was selected to represent the Transvaal school boys at Craven Week, earning a place in the South African schools boys side on the back of his performance there. Although he didn't go to university, he played for the Wits rugby club. In 1987 year he started playing for Transvaal, at the age of 18.

Rugby career

Provincial career
Small played much of his provincial career under coach Harry Viljoen, following him from Transvaal to Natal in 1993, and to Western Province in 1998. That same year he returned to the Transvaal, then known as the Golden Lions, but "had a string of discipline problems with former All Black coach Laurie Mains". He played for the Cats in 1999, and retired after an injury.

International career
His first Test match in 1992 was the first for the Springboks at the dawn of the new, internationally acceptable South Africa following the release of Nelson Mandela and the unbanning of the ANC. He was one of the heroes of the Springbok team that won the 1995 Rugby World Cup and later that year experienced the transition of rugby from an amateur  to a professional sport.

After the fall of apartheid, when the Springboks were being taught the lyrics to the new South African national anthem, "Nkosi Sikelel' iAfrika", Small was particularly enthusiastic about learning the lyrics. His response was that in his early days of playing rugby, he too was discriminated against, by Afrikaner players, for being of British descent rather than Dutch like they were. When the Springboks visited Robben Island on a tour, Small was very moved by what he saw and visibly wept, recalling later that "Thinking about Mandela's cell and how he spent twenty-seven years in prison and came out with love and friendship. All that washed over me, that huge realization, and the tears just rolled down my face."

Small faced Jonah Lomu as his opposite man in the final of the 1995 World Cup. Lomu had scored four tries in New Zealand's semifinal against England, but Small and his teammates managed to contain Lomu, preventing him from scoring. The Springboks won the match and the Cup.

Small's career was marred by his verbal abuse of others on the rugby field, gaining notoriety as being the "bad boy" of the Springbok team.

He became the first Springbok to ever be sent off, as a result of dissent towards referee Ed Morrison in the second test against Australia in 1993. In later years Small acknowledged that he felt he had let a lot of people down but that he was sent off as a result of an accumulation of incidents in the team. He faced a Springboks disciplinary hearing, but was selected for the third test match the following week.

Small was also alleged by his teammate Chester Williams to have uttered racist abuse towards him, though as an opponent in provincial rugby, not as a Springbok teammate.

Test Match record

Pld = Games Played, W = Games Won, D = Games Drawn, L = Games Lost, Tri = Tries Scored, Pts = Points Scored

Test tries (20)

World Cup matches
 Champions  Runners-up  Third place  Fourth place

Post rugby life, career and business interests

During his time as rugby player, Small worked as a model and became something of a sporting sex symbol. In a 2018 interview with John Robbie on the Sport Exchange, he lamented not making more of the opportunities presented to him, and regretted not having someone helping him to professionally manage and market his image and brand, which he saw as being available to international overseas sports icons. He did not know how to handle the money and opportunities that were available to him at the time, and he admitted once spending all the money he had earned on six Armani suits, instead of his career management.

He was involved in the building industry, renovating houses. He also owned a number of restaurants including having opened Café Caprice in Camps Bay.

He was also involved in commentating, and in coaching the game.  Small was involved with the Investec Rugby Academy, before being appointed Pukke assistant coach for the 2014 Varsity Cup. He then joined the Leopards in the Currie Cup First Division as coaching consultant. He was also involved in an online podcast "The elephant in the room" on rugby commentary with Darren Scott. The 50th birthday episode is available online.

In his personal life  he was involved in a long term relationship with Christina Storm. She is a well known local celebrity, and the tabloids regularly reported on their relationship, which was tumultuous. Christina Storm (now Storm-Nel), with whom he has a daughter, Ruby Small, has since married and has other children. He has publicly acknowledged and apologised for his abusive treatment of her, including in two incidents which turned physically violent. These claims were denied and proved untrue by Storm in an interview for ‘YOU’ magazine in 2020. He also sought therapy for a period of two years. He has said he has been arrogant and petulant, and it resulted in losing the love of his life. There was a publicised court battle over custody of his daughter.

He also attempted suicide in 2001, following the break up and was hospitalised and sectioned under South Africa's Mental Health Care Act for 3 months. He has also admitted misusing alcohol and cocaine, and had major struggles with alcohol misuse. President Nelson Mandela reportedly telephoned him personally and asked him what happened following his hospitalisation. The President listened to him and then simply said, "I know what it feels like if you think people have forgotten about you. I went through it as well in my time in prison." The two men were said to have a personal relationship. Small felt this helped him gain some perspective on his problems, and he was moved by the President's humanity in reaching out to him.

He attributed his recovery to his great friendships and his commitment to his, at the time, newborn daughter.

Death 
Small died in hospital on Wednesday morning on 10 July 2019, at the age of 50, after suffering a heart attack while having drinks at The Harem, a strip club in Johannesburg. Club co-owner, Jerome Saffi, confirmed that Small had collapsed while having drinks at the bar. An autopsy revealed the cause of death as ischeamic heart disease, and the police investigation into the circumstances surrounding his death revealed no suspicious circumstances.

Small's memorial was held at the Wanderers Rugby Field, and was open to all mourners. Former Springboks who attended included James Dalton, Kobus Wiese, Pierre Spies, Rudolf Straeuli, John Smit and Stefan Terblanche. Current Springbok captain Siya Kolisi was also there, as was Small's former partner, Christina Storm.

Small was survived by his son (9) and daughter (15), his sister and his mother. The South African Rugby Legends Association established a fundraising initiative in aid of James Small's family.

Tributes and legacy 
His record on the field, and the very many tributes from the sporting fraternity, amongst others, speak for themselves. Some examples are cited below:

"The African National Congress (ANC) is shocked and saddened by the passing of former Springbok player, James Small.

He was a member of the legendary South African Rugby squad that won the World Cup in 1995, a year after the ushering in of a democratic government in South Africa. The class of 1995 contributed enormously towards uniting the nation and displaying to the world South Africa’s sporting prowess. James Small was a patriot who fought like a soldier in the field of play and was prepared to die with his boots on. He played with extraordinary passion and commitment, for he knew that everytime he walked onto the field, he carried the hopes of the nation on his shoulders. The ANC conveys its heartfelt condolences to his family, friends and the entire sporting world."

The All Blacks  referred to him as a Springbok great and the 1995 Rugby World Cup winner, and went on to say he was "a fierce competitor on the field and great friend off it, James will be missed by the entire global rugby community. Rest In Peace, legend."  The Wallabies also acknowledged him as a legend. The widow of Jonah Lomu also acknowledged his death.

See also
List of South Africa national rugby union players – Springbok no. 561

References

External links

1969 births
2019 deaths
South African rugby union players
South Africa international rugby union players
Rugby union wings
Sharks (Currie Cup) players
South African people of British descent
Place of death missing
South African male models
Western Province (rugby union) players
Stormers players
Golden Lions players
Lions (United Rugby Championship) players
Restaurateurs
Alumni of Greenside High School
Rugby union players from Cape Town